Toms Creek is a  long 3rd order tributary to the Uwharrie River in Randolph County, North Carolina.

Variant names
According to the Geographic Names Information System, it has also been known historically as:
Mill Creek
Tom Creek

Course
Toms Creek rises in a pond on the Cabin Creek divide in Davidson County, about 1.5 miles southeast of Denton, North Carolina.  Toms Creek then flows northeast into Randolph County and makes a turn to the southeast to join the Uwharrie River about 2 miles southeast of Farmer, North Carolina.

Watershed
Toms Creek drains  of area, receives about 46.5 in/year of precipitation, has a wetness index of 392.78 and is about 59% forested.

References

Rivers of North Carolina
Rivers of Davidson County, North Carolina
Rivers of Randolph County, North Carolina